"Up 2 The Sky" is a song by Belgian DJ Laurent Wéry, featuring vocals from Mr. Shammi. The song was written by Laurent Wery and Krishna Salickram. It was released in Belgium as a digital download on June 1, 2013.

Music video
A music video to accompany the release of "Up 2 The Sky" was first released onto YouTube on May 30, 2013 at a total length of three minutes and five seconds.

Track listing
 Digital download
 "Up 2 the Sky" (Radio Slam) [feat. Mr. Shammi] – 3:03
 "Up 2 the Sky" (Extended Slam) [feat. Mr. Shammi] – 4:47
 "Up 2 the Sky" (Hands Up DJ Tool) [feat. Mr. Shammi] – 1:02
 "Up 2 the Sky" (Shammi On Da Mic - A Capella) [feat. Mr. Shammi] – 3:26

Credits and personnel
 Lead vocals – Mr. Shammi
 Lyrics – Laurent Wery, Krishna Salickram
 Producers – Laurent Wery
 Label: La Musique du Beau Monde

Chart performance

Weekly charts

Release history

References

2013 singles
Laurent Wéry songs
2013 songs